Jamestown is a village located northeast of Clarenville, Newfoundland and Labrador, Canada. It had a population of 143 in 1940 and a population of 149 in 1956.

See also
 List of communities in Newfoundland and Labrador

Populated places in Newfoundland and Labrador